Joseph Finnemore (1860–1939) was a prolific book and magazine illustrator who worked particularly for the Religious Tract Society. He was also a painter in oils.

He was born in Birmingham in 1860 and educated at the Birmingham School of Art and in Antwerp under Charles Verlat. Following a tour of Europe and the Near East in the early 1880s, he settled in London in 1884.

Of his paintings in oils, his works include The Proclamation of King Edward VII at St. James' Palace January 24, 1901 and On the Lookout, A Stormy Night.

He was a member of the Society of Illustrators, the Royal Society of British Artists (from 1893) and Royal Institute (from 1898).

Books illustrated by Joseph Finnemore 

 (Also includes illustrations by G.H. Thompson and Archibald Webb.)

References

External links
 
 

1860 births
1939 deaths
People from Birmingham, West Midlands
English illustrators
Alumni of the Birmingham School of Art